The 1934 Purdue Boilermakers football team was an American football team that represented Purdue University during the 1934 college football season.  In their fifth season under head coach Noble Kizer, the Boilermakers compiled a 5–3 record, finished in fourth place in the Big Ten Conference with a 3–1 record against conference opponents, and outscored opponents by a total of 93 to 75. Carl D. Heldt was the team captain.

Schedule

Roster

References

Purdue
Purdue Boilermakers football seasons
Purdue Boilermakers football